Waldo Lake is a natural alpine lake in the Cascade Mountains of the U.S. state of Oregon. The lake is named after Oregon politician, judge, and conservationist John B. Waldo.

Location
The forest road travels  to the lake.

History
The area was first inhabited by Native Americans, and the lake was later discovered by Molalla Indian Charlie Tufti. According to pioneer resident Frank S. Warner it was then named Pengra Lake after Byron J. Pengra, a pioneer railroad champion. Later the lake was named in honor of Judge John B. Waldo from the Oregon Supreme Court who helped push for preservation in the Cascades which began with the Cascade Forest Reserve established by President Cleveland in 1893. Waldo was the son of Daniel Waldo for whom the Waldo Hills are named.

The area was also used by sheep farmers for grazing prior to the establishment of recreation facilities by the Civilian Conservation Corps during the Great Depression in 1939. Later facilities were built by the Forest Service in 1971.

In 1979 the lake received around 10,000 visitor days per year, and by 1989 that number increased to 32,000 per year. Between those years, in 1984,  to the north, west, and south were designated as the Waldo Lake Wilderness by the federal government. In 1996, a forest fire, the Charlton fire, swept by the lake and forced the evacuation of several campgrounds while burning much of the north side of the lake's surrounding forest.

Reservoir plans
Starting in 1905, plans were begun to use the lake as a reservoir for irrigation in the Willamette Valley. 
To this end, the Waldo Lake Irrigation and Power Company was created in 1908 by several people including F.H. Ray. In 1909 a permit was issued by the Forest Service to build a tunnel from the lake to a nearby creek. Construction of the tunnel began that year and finished in 1914 under the direction of engineer Simon Klovdahl. However, the company was never able to prosper and the head gates on the southwest shore were sealed in 1960.

Details

This makes it the eighth largest lake in Oregon. This makes Waldo the second deepest lake in the state after Crater Lake. Like Crater Lake, Waldo Lake is ultraoligotrophic (having extremely clear water with very little organic material). It has no permanent inlet to carry nutrients into the lake for plant growth. As such, on a clear day one can see depths of up to 120 feet (36.5 m). The lake was restocked with trout every other year, until 1990 when efforts to preserve the water clarity halted the practice. The lake has a  speed limit for boats, but in 2010 gasoline motors were banned while electric motors are still allowed.

Recreation
Fishing
Boating
Hiking
Campgrounds:
North Waldo
Shadow Bay
Gold Lake
Taylor Burn
Islet
Waldo Lake is a very popular recreation site in the summer months. There are 205 designated campsites total among the campgrounds and an additional 50 primitive tent sites around the lake.

Surrounding area
Besides the lake, the area includes the Waldo Lake Wilderness. Additionally, the Pacific Crest Trail passes through the area. The lake is also the source of the North Fork Middle Fork Willamette River. There are numerous alpine lakes and small mountain peaks around Waldo Lake.

Waldo Lake and the surrounding area is part of the Willamette National Forest .

See also 
 List of lakes in Oregon

References

External links

US Forest Service: Waldo Lake Area
US Forest Service: Waldo Lake Wilderness
PSU: Center for Lakes and Reservoirs
History of the Waldo Lake Area (USFS)
Implications of Fish Stocking at Waldo Lake, Oregon

Cascade Range
Lakes of Oregon
Civilian Conservation Corps in Oregon
Lakes of Lane County, Oregon
Willamette National Forest
Protected areas of Lane County, Oregon